Kamchatka Oblast (Kamchatskaya oblast) was, until being incorporated into Kamchatka Krai on July 1, 2007, a federal subject of Russia (an oblast). To the north, it bordered Magadan Oblast and Chukotka Autonomous Okrug. Koryak Autonomous Okrug was located in the northern part of the oblast. The administrative center of Kamchatka Oblast was the city of Petropavlovsk-Kamchatsky. Population: 

Kamchatka's natural resources include coal, gold, mica, pyrites, and natural gas. Most of the inhabitants live in the administrative center, Petropavlovsk-Kamchatsky. The main employment sectors are fishing, forestry, tourism (a growing industry), and the Russian military. There is still a large military presence on the peninsula; the home base of Russia's Pacific submarine fleet is across Avacha Bay from Petropavlovsk-Kamchatsky at the Rybachy base. There are also several air force bases and radar sites in Kamchatka.

As of the 2002 All-Russian Population Census, the majority of the 358,801 population is Russian (290,108), largest minorities are Ukrainian (20,870) and Koryak (7,328).  The northern part of the peninsula is occupied by Koryak Autonomous Okrug, where around 6,700 Koryaks live. A small number of Evens also live here.

The oblast was established on October 20, 1932, subordinated to the Far Eastern Krai (later Khabarovsk Krai). In 1956, it became a separate oblast under its own jurisdiction.

Administrative divisions

See also
List of Chairmen of the Council of People's Deputies of Kamchatka Oblast

References

External links
 The Wonders of Kamchatka
 Commander Islands
 Images from the Central Eurasian Information Resource - University of Washington Digital Collection

Former federal subjects of Russia
Geography of Kamchatka Krai
History of the Kamchatka Peninsula
Kamchatka Krai
Politics of Kamchatka Krai
States and territories established in 1932
States and territories disestablished in 2007
1932 establishments in the Soviet Union
2007 disestablishments in Russia